Live 1992 is a jazz album by Stéphane Grappelli. The album features Philip Catherine and Marc Fosset, guitars, and Niels-Henning Ørsted Pedersen, bass. It is one of his last live albums before his death in 1997. The album was recorded live on March 27 and 28, 1992 at the Salle de spectacles de Colombes, France and produced by Jean François Deiber for Birdology records. The original more serious looking photo of Grappelli on the red cover of the Birdology release was replaced with a lighter and younger looking picture of Grappelli in a coat for Verve.

Reception

The Washington Post reviewer concluded: "don't be surprised if you find yourself not only humming but asking that fundamental Gershwin question: 'Who could ask for anything more?'" The Penguin Guide to Jazz wrote that Grappelli "sounds like he enjoyed this one as much as any gig in the past, oh, forty years or so". AllMusic described it as "one of his more worthwhile recordings – in live performance or the studio – during the last decade of his beautiful life".

Track listing

References

1992 live albums
Stéphane Grappelli albums